Sims Township is one of 13 townships in Grant County, Indiana, United States. As of the 2010 census, its population was 1,779 and it contained 757 housing units.

Geography
The streams of Taylor Creek and Stoney Creek run through this township.

Cities and towns
 Swayzee

Unincorporated towns
 Cole
 Sims
(This list is based on USGS data and may include former settlements.)

Adjacent townships
 Richland Township (north)
 Pleasant Township (northeast)
 Franklin Township (east)
 Liberty Township (southeast)
 Green Township (south)
 Union Township, Howard County (southwest)
 Jackson Township, Howard County (west)
 Jackson Township, Miami County (northwest)

Cemeteries
The township contains two cemeteries: Alel and Thraikill.

Major highways

References
 U.S. Board on Geographic Names (GNIS)
 United States Census Bureau cartographic boundary files

External links
 Indiana Township Association
 United Township Association of Indiana

Townships in Grant County, Indiana
Townships in Indiana